Marland Pratt Billings (March 11, 1902 – October 9, 1996) was an American structural geologist who was considered one of the greatest authorities on North American geology. Billings was Professor of Geology at Harvard University for almost his entire career, having joined the faculty in 1930 and retired to emeritus status  in 1972. He also taught for a brief time at Bryn Mawr College.

Biography
Billings was educated at Roxbury Latin School. He received his A.B. (1923), his A.M. (1925), and his Ph.D. (1927) from Harvard University.

In the 1950s, Billings studied the geology exposed by some of the bedrock tunnels being constructed in the Boston area by the Metropolitan District Commission for water supply and drainage disposal. He also investigated the geology of many parts of the world, including Iceland, Japan, and Australia.

Marland was married to Katharine Fowler-Billings an accomplished naturalist and geologist.

Marland Billings died Wednesday, October 9, 1996, in Peterborough, New Hampshire. He was 94.

Awards  and honors
 Fellow of the American Academy of Arts and Sciences (1938)
 Penrose Medal (1987)
 Member of the United States National Academy of Sciences

Associations
 Geological Society of America, President 1959
 American Geophysical Union
 Mineralogical Society of America
 Seismological Society of America

Bibliography
A partial list of books:
Origin of the Appalachian Highlands (1932)
Geology of the Littleton and Moosilauke quadrangles (1935)
Geology of the Franconia quadrangle (1935)
Structural Geology (1942) 
The Geology of the Mt. Washington Quadrangle (1946)
A Geological Map of New Hampshire (1955)
Geology of New Hampshire (1956)
Chemical analyses of rocks and rock-minerals from New Hampshire (1965)
Geology of the Gorham Quadrangle: New Hampshire-Maine (1965)
Geology of the Malden tunnel, Massachusetts (1966)
Geology of the North Metropolitan Relief Tunnel, great Boston, Massachusetts (1975)
Bedrock geology (The Geology of New Hampshire) (1980)

References

External links
Marland P. Billings 1902-1996, A Remembrance by Brian K. Fowler, Windswept, The Quarterly Bulletin of the Mount Washington Observatory, Vol. 38. No. 1, Spring 1997, pp. 53–54. 
Mount Washington Observatory
Mineralogical Museum at Harvard University

1902 births
1996 deaths
20th-century American geologists
Bryn Mawr College faculty
Fellows of the American Academy of Arts and Sciences
Harvard University alumni
Harvard University faculty
Penrose Medal winners
People from Peterborough, New Hampshire
Structural geologists
Members of the United States National Academy of Sciences
Roxbury Latin School alumni
Presidents of the Geological Society of America